was a Japanese Shinto priest and scholar of kokugaku. He was one of the heirs of the legacy of Hirata Atsutane, and during his lifetime was considered a leading figure in Tokyo's system of Shinto shrines.

Biography

Hirata was born in the town of Kasamatsu under the name  to the family of samurai , a local magistrate affiliated with the Owari Domain.

In 1894, Moritane was appointed high priest of Kanda Shrine in Tokyo. In 1899, he became an administrator of the Office of Japanese Classics Research. During the 1890s, Moritane also cooperated with fellow kokugakusha  at the latter's private academy in Tokyo where the two taught courses in traditional Japanese writing and stenography.

In 1913, Moritane officiated at the funeral of Tokugawa Yoshinobu. In 1928, when maintenance was carried out on the grave of Taira no Masakado, Moritane was involved in the coinciding ceremonies.
In 1942, the ageing Moritane presided over the state funeral for Japanese military personnel who died at Pearl Harbor.

In 1945, he evacuated along with his adopted son Hirata Munetane to Akita. He died there later that year.

References 

1863 births
1945 deaths
People from Gifu Prefecture
Writers from Gifu Prefecture
Kokugaku scholars
Japanese Shintoists